Sudduth Coliseum, in the Lake Charles Civic Center, is a 7,450-seat multi-purpose arena in Lake Charles, Louisiana, USA.  Located on Lakeshore Drive, it is the main arena of the Lake Charles Civic Center. It is a venue for hosting concerts and special events, including the 2006 Louisiana State Choir festival and Contraband Days. The center is named for former Lake Charles Mayor James Sudduth.

It also serves as a host for gun shows, professional wrestling, dance performances, professional and amateur fights, school field trips and The National Day of Prayer ceremony in Lake Charles. Contraband Days is a large festival held on the grounds. The center served as a shelter for displaced residents whose homes were devastated by Hurricanes Katrina and Rita.

The center also hosted UFC 22: There Can Be Only One Champion, as well as UFC 24. It also holds Rampage in the Cage events. It also used to be the home stadium of Lake Charles' former pro hockey team, the Lake Charles Ice Pirates who played in the Western Professional Hockey League and the Louisiana Swashbucklers indoor football team.  The center was authorized as the location of an American Basketball Association team, the Lake Charles Hurricanes. However, lack of funding caused the team to fold without playing a single game.

The coliseum was also the former home of the McNeese State Cowboys basketball team from 1972 to 1986 when the team moved to the Burton Coliseum.

Its former director, Allen "Puddler" Harris, is a former member of the bands of Ricky Nelson, Conway Twitty, and Jimmie Davis.

See also
List of convention centers in the United States
List of music venues

References

External links
Sudduth Coliseum Website

Basketball venues in Louisiana
Convention centers in Louisiana
Indoor arenas in Louisiana
Indoor ice hockey venues in Louisiana
McNeese Cowboys basketball
Mixed martial arts venues in Louisiana
Sports venues in Louisiana
Sports venues in Lake Charles, Louisiana
Music venues in Louisiana
Buildings and structures in Lake Charles, Louisiana
Tourist attractions in Calcasieu Parish, Louisiana
1972 establishments in Louisiana
Sports venues completed in 1972